George Edward "Bud" Gardner (October 8, 1942 – November 6, 2006) was a Canadian ice hockey goaltender. He played in the National Hockey League (NHL) for the Detroit Red Wings and Vancouver Canucks, and in the World Hockey Association (WHA) for the Los Angeles Sharks and Vancouver Blazers, in a career that lasted from 1963 until 1974. After several years with the Red Wings and their minor league affiliates, Gardner joined the Canucks as they entered the NHL in 1970, becoming their first goalie. He spent two seasons in Vancouver before leaving for the rival WHA, spending two seasons there before retiring. He died in 2006 in Florida.

Career statistics

Regular season and playoffs

References

External links
 

1942 births
2006 deaths
Anglophone Quebec people
Canadian ice hockey goaltenders
Detroit Red Wings players
Ice hockey people from Montreal
Los Angeles Sharks players
People from Lachine, Quebec
Pittsburgh Hornets players
Roanoke Valley Rebels (SHL) players
Rochester Americans players
Vancouver Blazers players
Vancouver Canucks (WHL) players
Vancouver Canucks players